Tingvollfjorden or Tingvollfjord can refer to:

Tingvollfjorden (Møre og Romsdal), a fjord in Møre og Romsdal county, Norway
Tingvollfjorden (Viken), a lake in Ål municipality in Viken county, Norway